The Middleweight (75 kg) competition at the 2014 AIBA Women's World Boxing Championships was held from 19–24 November 2014.

Medalists

Draw

Top half

Bottom half

Final

References

Middleweight